George Casey was an Australian rugby league footballer who played in the 1920s.  He played for Newtown in the New South Wales Rugby League (NSWRL) competition.

Playing career
Casey made his first grade debut for Newtown against Balmain in round 8 of the 1929 season scoring two tries in a 23–11 victory.  Newtown would go on to upset St George 8–7 at Earl Park, Arncliffe in the semi-final to reach the 1929 NSWRL grand final.

In the grand final, Newtown's opponents were the all conquering South Sydney side who were looking to win their 5th premiership in a row.  Casey played on the wing in the final as Newtown never troubled Souths losing 30–10 at the Sydney Sports Ground in front of 16,360 fans.  Casey scored a try and kicked two goals in the defeat.  The grand final defeat was Casey's last game for the club.

References

Newtown Jets players
Australian rugby league players
Rugby league players from Sydney
Rugby league wingers
Rugby league centres